The women's foil was one of ten fencing events on the fencing at the 1996 Summer Olympics programme. It was the fifteenth appearance of the event. The competition was held on 22 July 1996. 40 fencers from 17 nations competed.

Draw

Finals

Section 1

Section 2

Section 3

Section 4

Results

References

Foil women
1996 in women's fencing
Fen